Roy station is a FrontRunner commuter rail station in Roy, Utah, United States. It is operated by the  Utah Transit Authority (UTA).

Description 
The station is located at 4155 South Sandridge Drive on approximately 20.5 acres of land and is accessed from 4000 South (SR-37) at 2300 West. Unlike nearly all other stations served by the FrontRunner, the station is located in a primarily residential area.

The station has a free Park and Ride lot with about 500 parking spaces available. The station is located within the Quiet Zone, so trains do not routinely sound their horns when approaching public crossings within this corridor. The inaugural FrontRunner train departed the station southbound at 8:30 am on April 26, 2008.

References 

Railway stations in the United States opened in 2008
UTA FrontRunner stations
Transportation in Weber County, Utah
2008 establishments in Utah
Railway stations in Weber County, Utah
Roy, Utah